Cossett Creek is a stream located entirely within Medina County, Ohio.

Cossett Creek was named for a pioneer who settled there.

See also
List of rivers of Ohio

References

Rivers of Medina County, Ohio
Rivers of Ohio